

Federation Training 
Established 1 May 2014 following the amalgamation of Advance TAFE and GippsTAFE, with 10 campuses from Warragul in West Gippsland across the state to Lakes Entrance in the east.

GippsTAFE Academy 
In 2012, GippsTAFE opened its doors to the GippsTAFE Academy, located in the heart of Traralgon. The Academy introduces higher education programs for the first time, including graduate certificates and graduate diplomas. Pathway options to University will also be a focus for the Academy.

GippsTAFE also offers a range of other services including:
	•	The GETT Centre, which provides training and employment opportunities for individuals who suffer from disability or illness.
	•	The GippsTAFE Skills Gateway, which is a free assessment service that matches an individuals skills or experience to a qualification and provides credits towards the qualification.
	•	Customised Training Solutions for organisations and businesses.

Gippsland Educational Precinct
In 2004 Central Gippsland Institute of TAFE (GippsTAFE) signed a partnership agreement to develop the Gippsland Education Precinct (GEP) at Churchill together with Monash University, Gippsland Group Training, Kurnai Secondary College and Latrobe City, to provide wider vocational options and lift the region's high school retention rate. The $12million project funded by the Victorian Government will include a state-of-the-art technology centre, which will allow for advanced apprenticeship training in trades that rely heavily on information technology systems.

Education in Victoria (Australia)
Gippsland (region)